The Jain stupa was a type of stupa erected by the Jains for devotional purposes. A Jain stupa dated to the 1st century BCE-1st century CE was excavated at Mathura in the 19th century, in the Kankali Tila mound.

Jain legends state that the earliest Jain stupa was built in the 8th century BCE, before the time of the Jina Parsvanatha.

There is a possibly that the Jains adopted stupa worships from the Buddhists, but that is an unsettled point. However the Jain stupa has a peculiar cylindrical three-tier structure, which is quite reminiscent of the Samavasarana, by which it was apparently ultimately replaced as an object of worship. The name for stupa as used in Jain inscriptions is the standard word "thupe".

Mathura Jain stupas
A Jain stupa dated to the 1st century BCE-1st century CE was excavated at Mathura in the 19th century, in the Kankali Tila mound. Numerous associated religious works of art were also discovered during the excavations. Many of these are votive tablets, called ayagapatas. They are numerous, and some of the earliest ones have been dated to circa 50-20 BCE. 

According to Jain legends, five Jain stupas were built in Mathura.

Ayagapatas

The Jain devotional reliefs called Ayagapatas, particularly that dedicated by Vasu, shows a probable design of the Jain stupa. The stupa drum is set on a high platform, and accessed by a flight of stairs and an ornate torana gate, quite similar in style to the toranas of Sanchi. Niches with images can be seen in front of the platform. The drum of the stupa is elongated and cylindrical, and formed of three superposed tiers separated by railings and decorated bands. The stupa starts to round off only above these three tiers. The platform may have been squared, with Persepolitan-type columns in each corner, similar to those seen in the Vasu Ayagapata. On the Vasu ayagapata, one of the Persepolitan pillars is surmounted by a Dharmachakra wheel, and the other pillar was probably surmounted by an animal, as seen in other similar ayagapatas.

The Sivayasa ayagapata shows clearly two triratna symbols on top of the torana, as well as a central flame palmette design.

Jain stupas in narrative reliefs

By 100 BCE, a relief from Mathura is known, the Kankali Tila architrave, representing centaurs worshipping a Jain stupa.

Here again the Jain stupa in the middle of the relief is of cylindrical type with a three-tier design, separated by three horizontal railings. 

These reliefs are among the first known examples of Jain sculpture. The centaurs appearing in the Mathura reliefs, as in other places such as Bodh Gaya, are generally considered as Western borrowings. Robert Graves (relying on the work of Georges Dumézil, who argued for tracing the centaurs back to the Indian Gandharva), speculated that the centaurs were a dimly remembered, pre-Hellenic fraternal earth cult who had the horse as a totem.

See also
 Jain temple
 Vaddamanu

References

Jain architecture
Jain temples